Petty France is a hamlet in the rural north of South Gloucestershire, near the Gloucestershire border,  in Hawkesbury parish. It is on the A46, which runs from Bath, to Nailsworth and Stroud, just south of another, slightly smaller hamlet, Dunkirk.

Previously, Petty France and Dunkirk were known as road accident hotspots. The proportion of fatal and serious accidents was 46%, significantly higher than the average for South Gloucestershire as a whole, which is 12%. 13 accidents occurred between 1 January 1998 and 31 December 2001, including 2 fatal accidents, four were serious and seven were slight., as a result of this the speed through the two hamlets was reduced to 40 MPH. Badminton and Hawkesbury Upton are also nearby.

The Manor House in Petty France was built in 1812 for Robert Jenkinson, 2nd Earl of Liverpool, prime minister from 1812 to 1827.  The house has seen the likes of Lord Wellington, and has been in the ownership of the poet Wordsworth's family, Lord and Lady Apsley and the Duke of Beaufort; today it is a hotel.

Cultural references

In her novel Northanger Abbey (written in 1803, but not published until 1817), Jane Austen mentions Petty France as a dull two-hour rest stop on the road between Bath and the fictional abbey: "There was nothing to be done but to eat without being hungry, and to loiter about without anything to see."

References

External links

Villages in South Gloucestershire District